Rhabdotenes is a genus of moths belonging to the subfamily Tortricinae of the family Tortricidae.

Species
Rhabdotenes anthracobathra (Meyrick, 1938)
Rhabdotenes arachnodes (Diakonoff, 1944)
Rhabdotenes cylicophora (Diakonoff, 1954)
Rhabdotenes dacryta Diakonoff, 1974
Rhabdotenes dicentropa Diakonoff, 1972
Rhabdotenes mesotrauma (Diakonoff, 1954)
Rhabdotenes octosticta (Meyrick, 1930)
Rhabdotenes operosa (Diakonoff, 1954)
Rhabdotenes pachydesma (Diakonoff, 1954)
Rhabdotenes phloeotis (Diakonoff, 1954)
Rhabdotenes semisericea Diakonoff, 1960
Rhabdotenes subcroceata (Meyrick, 1938)
Rhabdotenes velutina (Diakonoff, 1954)
Rhabdotenes vinki Diakonoff, 1972

See also
List of Tortricidae genera

References

External links
Tortricid.net

Tortricidae genera